The Aiglemont estate  is an estate at Gouvieux in the Picardy region of France and functions as the secretariat and residence of His Highness Prince Karīm al-Hussaynī Āgā Khān IV.  It is the headquarters of the Aga Khan Development Network, one of the largest international development networks in the world.

References

Oise
Aga Khan Development Network